The St. Louis Browns were a Major League Baseball team that played in St. Louis, Missouri from 1902 through 1953. The franchise moved from Milwaukee, Wisconsin, where it was known as the Milwaukee Brewers, after the 1901 season.  It moved to Baltimore, Maryland after the 1953 season, where it became known as the Baltimore Orioles.  The Browns played their home games at Sportsman's Park.  They played in the American League. The first game of the new baseball season for a team is played on Opening Day, and being named the Opening Day starter is an honor, which is often given to the player who is expected to lead the pitching staff that season, though there are various strategic reasons why a team's best pitcher might not start on Opening Day. The Browns used 35 different Opening Day starting pitchers in their 52 seasons. The Browns won 26 of those games against 25 losses in those Opening Day starts.  They also played one tie game.

Urban Shocker and Ned Garver had the most Opening Day starts for the Browns, with four apiece. Harry Howell, Carl Weilman, Sam Gray and Bobo Newsom each had three Opening Day starts for the Browns. The other pitchers with multiple Opening Day starts for the Browns were Red Donahue, Jack Powell and Lefty Stewart. The Browns won three of both Shocker's and Garver's Opening Day starts, more than any other Browns' pitchers. The Browns lost two of Weilman's Opening Day starts. They did not lose more than one Opening Day game started by any other pitcher.

Although over their history the Browns won only one more Opening Day game than they lost, they did have a nine-game winning streak in Opening Day games from 1937 through 1945. That winning streak immediately followed their longest losing streak in Opening Day games, which was five losses from 1932 through 1936.

The Browns' first game in St. Louis was played on April 23, 1902 against the Cleveland Indians at Sportsman's Park. Their Opening Day starting pitcher for that game was Red Donahue. The Browns won the game 5–2. The Browns advanced to the World Series only once during their time in St. Louis, in 1944.  In their only postseason appearance, they lost the 1944 World Series to their Sportsman's Park cotennant St. Louis Cardinals, four games to two.  Jack Kramer was the Browns Opening Day starting pitcher that season. The Browns won that game.

The franchise's only major league Opening Day game as the Milwaukee Brewers was played on April 25, 1901 against the Detroit Tigers in Detroit. Pink Hawley was the Brewers' Opening Day starting pitcher. The Brewers lost the game by a score of 14–13.

Key

Pitchers

Footnote
 As the Milwaukee Brewers

References

Opening day starters
Lists of Major League Baseball Opening Day starting pitchers
Opening day starters